Sandi Simcha DuBowski is an American director and producer, best known for his work on the intersection of LGBT people and their religion, DuBowski directed the 2001 documentary Trembling Before G-d and is the producer of Parvez Sharma's documentary A Jihad for Love (formerly known as In the Name of Allah) (2007).

Personal life
DuBowski was born in Brooklyn in 1970. He was raised in Conservative Judaism.

DuBowski attended Hunter College High School in New York City, during which he was selected to participate in Camp Rising Sun, the Louis August Jonas Foundation's international summer scholarship program.
In 1992, DuBowski graduated magna cum laude from Harvard University. As an undergraduate, he received two Ford Program for Undergraduate Research grants for his work on homosexuality in Hollywood and independent film.

He lives and works in New York City.

Work

Before beginning full-length films, DuBowski worked for Planned Parenthood as a research associate for nearly three years, creating videos on the Christian Right and anti-abortion movement. In 1996 he produced Missionaries Form Militias, documenting anti-abortion leader Rev. Matt Trewhella calling for the formation of armed militias. It was screened for Attorney General Janet Reno and federal law enforcement officials, following the murder of abortion provider Dr. Bayard Britton. An excerpt was run on CBS News, was reported by publications including The New York Times and Newsweek, and has been used by the Northwest Coalition Against Malicious Harassment to train human rights activists.

In 2006, DuBowski appeared in the Paul Festa documentary Apparition of the Eternal Church. The film captures the responses of 31 authors, musicians, filmmakers and dancers as they listen to Olivier Messiaen's organ piece "Apparition of the Eternal Church."

DuBowski has worked as speaker and has moderated numerous religious dialogues on homosexuality, including a Mormon-Jewish dialogue and Christian-Muslim-Jewish panel. He and Steven Greenberg, the first openly gay Orthodox rabbi, have traveled to 60 cities and organized over 400 question-and-answer sessions, dialogues, events, inter-faith discussions.

Tomboychik (1994)

Tomboychik is a 15-minute video directed by and starring DuBowski. The story, shown through a series of vignettes, centers around his relationship with his grandmother, Malverna DuBowski, as 22-year-old Sandi DuBowski attempts to teach his 88-year-old grandmother how to film. The short video portrays struggles against gender roles and patriarchy.

The Melbourne International Film Festival described the film:

Trembling Before G-d (2001)

Growing up, DuBowski had not known any Orthodox Jews. The main motivation to make the film was curiosity.

The film took more than six years to make. During this time, DuBowski grew more religious and began studying the Torah regularly, he said, "It was a whole world I hadn't experienced growing up. It gave me a beauty and love for the tradition of Judaism."

A Jihad for Love (2007)

DuBowski produced the documentary A Jihad for Love (previously known as In the Name of Allah), directed by Parvez Sharma.  Filmed in 11 different countries in 9 different languages, the film explores the lives of gay, lesbian, and transgender Muslims, and DuBowski intends for it to be "a profound catalyst for change"

As producer, DuBowski said that he wanted to screen the film in "every Muslim nation, even if it's underground."

Awards and recognition
DuBowski was named one of The Jewish Daily Forward'''s "Forward 50", which is given to the 50 Jews who have "been at the center of the year's events, demonstrating leadership, offering new ideas and representing a distinct Jewish presence in American life." He is also a recipient of the Rockefeller Foundation's Film/Video/Multimedia Fellowship and the Creative Capital Moving Image Award.

Along with Rabbi Steven Greenberg, DuBowski was awarded seed funding by Steven Spielberg's Righteous Persons Foundation in order to launch an Orthodox community education project for Trembling Before G-d in the U.S., Israel and the U.K.

FilmographyTomboychik (1994) — director, producer, photographer, editor, actorMissionaries Form Militias Unholy Alliance (1996) — directorTrembling Before G-d (2001) — director, producerA Jihad for Love'' (2007) — producer

References

External links
Online conference with Sandi DuBowski at The D-Word
Sandi DuBowski in the Video Data Bank
 

Living people
1970 births
Harvard University alumni
Hunter College High School alumni
LGBT Jews
Film directors from New York City
American documentary film producers
LGBT film directors
Radical Faeries members
Camp Rising Sun alumni
Film producers from New York (state)